Bill McChesney may refer to:
 Bill McChesney (politician) (born 1948), former member of the Montana House of Representatives
 Bill McChesney (athlete) (1959–1992), American long-distance runner